SMA Negeri 5 Bandung (also known as SMU 5 Bandung or SMA 5 Bandung) is a public high school located on Jalan Belitung in Bandung, West Java, Indonesia. It shares the same building with SMA Negeri 3 Bandung, consequently giving the schools the nickname SMA Belitung Delapan after the street and recently being nicknamed as "Belitung Timur" because the school is located on the East Wing of Belitung Delapan building, while SMA Negeri 3 Bandung is "Belitung Barat" for its location on the West Wing.

Many graduates enroll in notable Indonesian universities, e.g. Institut Teknologi Bandung and Padjadjaran University. 

SMA Negeri 5 Bandung was established in 1953, occupying a former Dutch colonial school building. The building was designed by C.P. Wolff Schoemaker. The construction began in 1916. Initially three high schools shared the building, with the other two being SMA Negeri 2 and 3 Bandung. By 1966, SMA Negeri 2 started occupying a new building on Jalan Cihampelas. SMA Negeri 5 Bandung has been using the eastern part of the building ever since, with SMA Negeri 3 Bandung residing in the west.

Accreditation
SMAN 5 Bandung has gained an ISO of 9001-2008 and has been credited by an accreditation team from SGS Jakarta, from 13 April 2009 until 15 April 2009. The school is a spearhead for the development of Schools with International Standards in West Java. On the national level, SMAN 5 Bandung has gained an A+ from the Indonesian Ministry of Education.

External links
 Official website
 Ekskul 5

Schools in Indonesia
Schools in Bandung